Sing, Neighbor, Sing is a 1944 American musical film directed by Frank McDonald and written by Dorrell McGowan and Stuart E. McGowan. Starring Stanley Brown, Ruth Terry, Roy Acuff, Virginia Brissac, Rachel Veach, Myrtle Wiseman and Scotty Wiseman, it was released on August 12, 1944, by Republic Pictures.

Plot

Cast  
Stanley Brown as Bob Reed, Posing as Professor Jasper Cartwright 
Ruth Terry as Virginia Blake
Roy Acuff as Roy Acuff
Virginia Brissac as Cornelia Blake
Rachel Veach as Rachel 
Myrtle Wiseman as Lulubelle
Scotty Wiseman as Scotty 
Beverly Lloyd as Beverly
Charles Irwin as Professor Jasper Cartwright
Olin Howland as Joe the Barber 
Maxine Doyle as Maxine
Mary Kenyon as Mary
Harry Cheshire as Dean Cheshire 
The Milo Twins as The Singing Twins
Carolina Cotton as Carolina
Roy Acuff's Smoky Mountain Boys and Girls as Roy Acuff Band Members

References

External links

1944 films
American musical films
1944 musical films
Republic Pictures films
Films directed by Frank McDonald
American black-and-white films
1940s English-language films
1940s American films